is a district located in Tottori Prefecture, Japan.

As of 2003, the district has an estimated population of 50,436 and a density of 135.28 persons per km2. The total area is 372.83 km2.

Towns and villages
Daisen
Hiezu
Hōki
Nanbu

Mergers
On October 1, 2004 the towns of Saihaku and Aimi merged to form the new town of Nanbu.
On January 1, 2005 the town of Kishimoto merged with the town of Mizokuchi from Hino District to form the new town of Hōki in Saihaku District.
On March 28, 2005 the towns of Nakayama and Nawa merged into the town of Daisen.
On March 31, 2005 the town of Yodoe merged into the city of Yonago.

Districts in Tottori Prefecture